Chintara Sukapatana, born Chittima Sukapatana (on January 22, 1965), nickname Mam, is a Thai actress. Her best-known role was as Trinh in the 1987 Hollywood film, Good Morning, Vietnam, in which she co-starred opposite Robin Williams. At the time, she had a Bachelor in Business Administration and was a Master in Public Administration student at Krirk University.

Filmography 

Lee (1985)
Song Phi Nong (1985)
Kaew Krang Dong (1985)
The Couple (1986)
Legal Wife (1986)
Trouble Makers (1986)
One Heart (1986)
Jealousy (Raeng Hueang) (1986)
Duang Jai Krazip Rak (1986)
Scholar Maid (1986)
Love Letter (1986)
Phai Sanae Ha (1987)
Promise (1987)
Lang Kha Daeng (1987)
Relatives (1987)
U & Me 1 (1987)
Duay Klaw (1987)
Love (1987)
Victim (1987)
With Love (1987)
Sarasin Bridge (1987)
Good Morning, Vietnam (1987)
Something About “Art” 1 (1988)
Karn (1988)
Accidental Love (1988)
Khu Kam (1988)
Virgin Market (1988)
Boonchu 1 (1988)
Senior (1988)
U & Me 2 (1988)
Something About “Art” 2 (1989)
Silhouette Of God (1989)
Mean Teacher (1989)
Chai Laew Lud Lei (1989)
Fallen Angel (1989)
Boonchu 2 (1989)
Yim Nid Kid Thoa Rai (1989)
New Rich (1989)
Suthee (1989)
The Musicians (1989)
Southern Sea (1990)
Nang-Eye (1990)
Boonchu 5 (1990)
Class 44 (1990) 
Boonchu 6 (1991)
Dog (1991)
Sir Ghost (1991)
Nothing Can Stop (1992)
Phiang Rao Mi Rao  (1992)
Teacher “Chan Ram” (1992)
Cha Ku Rak Kot Nong Hai Kong Lok (1992)
Cha Yai Cha Yo Ko Pho Rao (1992)
I Miss You (1992)
Somsri #422 R. (1992)
Hor Hue Hue (1992)
Kot Kho Kan Waeo
Boonchu 7 (1992)
Somsri Ii (1993)
Muen And Rid (1993)
High School Life 1 (1993)
Once Upon a Time (1994)
Boonchu 8 (1994)
Somsri Iii (1994)
High School Life 2 (1995)
Satang (2000)
Feng Shui (2003)
Chue Chop Chuan Harueang (2003)
Dek hor (2006)
Boonchu 9 (2008)
Bittersweet BoydPod The Short Film (2008)
Love, Not Yet (2011)

Television 
See Pan Din (Four Reigns) (1991)
 Chaloey Sak (1991)
 Kwarm Ruk See Dum (1995)
 Sapai Glai Peun Tiang (2009)
 Suphapburut Juthathep (2013)
 Sud Kaen Saen Rak (2015)
 Nueng Dao Fah Deaw (2018)

References

External links 
 

1965 births
Living people
Chintara Sukapatana
Chintara Sukapatana
Chintara Sukapatana
Chintara Sukapatana
Chintara Sukapatana
Chintara Sukapatana